Shout It Out is the debut studio album by German recording artist Tobias Regner. It was released by Sony BMG in association with 19 Recordings on April 28, 2006 in German-speaking Europe, following his participation in the third season of Deutschland sucht den Superstar, which he won.

Track listing 
Credits adapted from the liner notes of Straight .

Charts

Weekly charts

Year-end charts

References

External links
 Tobias-Regner.com — official site

2006 albums
19 Recordings albums
Sony BMG albums